Ardha Raathri is a 1986 Indian Malayalam film, directed by Asha Khan and produced by Swaraj. The film stars Ratheesh, Madhuri, Captain Raju and Anuradha in the lead roles. The film has musical score by K. J. Joy.

Cast
Ratheesh
Madhuri
Captain Raju
Anuradha
Babitha Justin
Bheeman Raghu
Disco Shanti
Kundara Johnny
T. G. Ravi
Nalinikanth

Soundtrack
The music was composed by K. J. Joy and the lyrics were written by Bharanikkavu Sivakumar.

References

External links
 

1986 films
1980s Malayalam-language films